Patrick James Higgins (born May 10, 1993) is an American professional baseball catcher in the Arizona Diamondbacks organization. He has played in Major League Baseball (MLB) for the Chicago Cubs. He was drafted by the Cubs in the 12th round of the 2015 Major League Baseball draft out of Old Dominion University.

Early life
Higgins was born and raised in Connecticut, growing up in Wallingford. Higgins attended Lyman Hall High School, and graduated in 2011. He went on to attend Old Dominion University where he played NCAA Division 1 baseball.

Career

Chicago Cubs
Higgins was drafted by the Chicago Cubs in 12th round, 353rd overall, of the 2015 Major League Baseball draft.

Higgins made his professional debut with the rookie ball AZL Cubs in 2015, and also played for the Low-A Eugene Emeralds, accumulating a batting line of .299/.351/.445. In 2016, Higgins played for the Single-A South Bend Cubs, slashing .283/.389/.355 with 40 RBI. The next year, he played for the High-A Myrtle Beach Pelicans, batting .237/.327/.298 with a career-high 4 home runs. He split the 2018 season between Myrtle Beach and the Double-A Tennessee Smokies, posting a .271/.353/.366 line with 4 home runs and a career-high in RBI, with 52. In 2019, Higgins split the season between the Triple-A Iowa Cubs and Tennessee, batting .281/.349/.416 with career-highs in home runs (10) and RBI (57).

Higgins did not play in a game in 2020 due to the cancellation of the minor league season because of the COVID-19 pandemic. He was assigned to Triple-A Iowa to begin the 2021 season.

On May 19, 2021, Higgins was selected to the 40-man roster and promoted to the major leagues for the first time. He made his MLB debut that night against the Washington Nationals as a replacement for Jason Heyward, going hitless in 3 at-bats. On June 3, Higgins recorded his first major league hit, a single off of San Diego Padres pitcher Austin Adams. On June 16, he was placed on the 60-day injured list with a right forearm strain. He was later diagnosed with a partially torn UCL that required Tommy John surgery, ending his 2021 season. On November 5, Higgins was outrighted off of the 40-man roster. Higgins re-signed with the Cubs on a minor league deal on November 19, 2021.

Higgins was assigned to Triple-A Iowa to begin the 2022 season. On May 22, 2022, Higgins was selected to the 40-man and active rosters. In 2022 with the Cubs he batted .229/.310/.383. On December 29, 2022, Higgins was designated for assignment. He was sent outright to Triple-A Iowa on January 6, 2023. Higgins rejected the outright assignment and elected free agency on January 9.

Arizona Diamondbacks
On January 12, 2023, Higgins signed a minor league contract with the Arizona Diamondbacks organization.

References

External links

1993 births
Living people
People from Bridgeport, Connecticut
Baseball players from Connecticut
Major League Baseball catchers
Chicago Cubs players
Old Dominion Monarchs baseball players
Arizona League Cubs players
Eugene Emeralds players
South Bend Cubs players
Myrtle Beach Pelicans players
Tennessee Smokies players
Iowa Cubs players
Mesa Solar Sox players